Tufanganj  Assembly constituency is an assembly constituency in Cooch Behar district in the Indian state of West Bengal.

Overview
As per orders of the Delimitation Commission, No. 9 Tufanganj Assembly constituency covers Tufanganj municipality, Tufanganj II community development block, and Andaran Fulbari I, Balabhut, Dhalpal I, Nakkatigachh gram panchayats of Tufanganj I community development block.

Tufanganj Assembly constituency is part of No. 2 Alipurduars (Lok Sabha constituency) (ST).

Members of Legislative Assembly

Election results

2021

In the 2021 West Bengal Legislative Assembly election, Malati Rava Roy of BJP defeated her nearest rival Pranab Kumar Dey of TMC.

2016

In the 2016 West Bengal Legislative Assembly election, Fazal Karim Miah of TMC defeated his nearest rival Shyamal Chowdhury of Congress.

2011

In the 2011 West Bengal Legislative Assembly election, Arghya Roy Pradhan of TMC defeated his nearest rival Dhananjoy Rava of CPI(M).

1972-2006
In the 2006 state assembly elections, Alaka Barman of CPI(M) won the  9 Tufanganj (SC) Assembly seat defeating her nearest rival Malati Rava (Ray) of BJP. Contests in most years were multi cornered but only winners and runners are being mentioned. Puspa Chandra Das of CPI(M) defeated Sachindra Chandra Das representing Trinamool Congress in 2001 and representing Congress in 1996. Debendranath Barman of CPI(M) defeated Mahesh Chandra Barman of Congress in 1991. Manindranath Barma of CPI(M)  defeated Sisir Isore of Congress in 1987, Sankar Sen Ishore of Congress in 1982 and Surendra Narayan Roy Kungar of Congress in 1977.

1957-1972
During 1967 to 1972  Tufanganj was a reserved seat for SC. Sisir Isore of Congress won in 1972 and 1971. Akshay Kumar Barma of Congress won in 1969. I.S.Sen of Congress won in 1967. In 1962 and 1957, it was an open seat. Jiban Krishna Dey of CPI won in 1962. Jatindra Nath Sinha Sarker of Congress won in 1957.

References

Assembly constituencies of West Bengal
Politics of Cooch Behar district